Master–slave or master/slave may refer to:

 Master/slave (technology), a model of communication between two devices in computing
 Master–slave dialectic, a concept in Hegelian philosophy
 Master–slave morality, a central theme of Friedrich Nietzsche's works
 Master/slave (BDSM), a type of consensual relationship of dominance and submission
 Letter 47 (Seneca), also known as On Master and Slave
"Master/Slave", a hidden track by the alternative rock band Pearl Jam on the album Ten

See also
 Master (disambiguation)
 Slave (disambiguation)